Mark Dickson and Cássio Motta were the defending champions, but lost in the second round to Bud Cox and Danny Saltz.

Ken Flach and Robert Seguso won the title by defeating Gary Donnelly and Ernie Fernández 6–4, 6–4 in the final.

Seeds
The top four seeds receive a bye into the second round.

Draw

Finals

Top half

Bottom half

References

External links
 Official results archive (ATP)
 Official results archive (ITF)

1984 Grand Prix (tennis)
U.S. Pro Tennis Championships
1984 in American tennis